The 17th edition of Strade Bianche was held on 4 March 2023. It was the fifth event of the 2023 UCI World Tour.

Teams
Twenty-five teams participated in the race, all eighteen UCI WorldTeams and seven UCI ProTeams.

UCI WorldTeams

 
 
 
 
 
 
 
 
 
 
 
 
 
 
 
 
 
 

UCI ProTeams

Result

References

Strade Bianche
Strade Bianche
Strade Bianche
Strade Bianche